is a railway station in Minami-ku, Nagoya, Japan, operated by Central Japan Railway Company (JR Tōkai). It is also a terminal station for the freight-only Nagoya Rinkai Railway Tōkō Line.

Lines
Kasadera Station is served by the Tōkaidō Main Line, and is located 356.8 kilometers from the starting point of the line at Tokyo Station.

Station layout
The station has one island platform and two opposed side platforms connected to the station building by a footbridge. The station building has automated ticket machines, TOICA automated turnstiles and a staffed ticket office.

Platforms

Adjacent stations

|-
!colspan=5|Central Japan Railway Company

Station history
Kasadera Station was established on 10 April 1942 as a signal stop on the Japanese Government Railways (JGR), primarily to serve a large military ordnance factory active during World War II. It was elevated to full station status on 1 June 1943. The station was destroyed during the Nagoya Air Raid of 17 May 1945 and was rebuilt in February 1949. The JGR became the JNR after the end of the war. A new station was built in May 1964. The Nagoya Rinkai Railway began operations in August 1965, and all freight operations were transferred to this company after May 1981.  With the privatization and dissolution of the JNR on 1 April 1987, the station came under the control of the Central Japan Railway Company. A new station building was completed in April 1988.

Station numbering was introduced to the section of the Tōkaidō Line operated JR Central in March 2018; Kasadera Station was assigned station number CA64.

Passenger statistics
In fiscal 2017, the station was used by an average of 7,830 passengers daily

Surrounding area
 Nippon Gaishi Hall

See also
 List of Railway Stations in Japan

References

Yoshikawa, Fumio. Tokaido-sen 130-nen no ayumi. Grand-Prix Publishing (2002) .

External links

Official home page

Railway stations in Japan opened in 1943
Tōkaidō Main Line
Stations of Central Japan Railway Company
Railway stations in Nagoya
Railway stations in Aichi Prefecture